Pobijenik (Serbian Cyrillic: Побијеник) is a mountain in western Serbia, between cities of Prijepolje and Priboj. Its highest peak Borak has an elevation of 1,423 meters above sea level.

References

Mountains of Serbia